Resampling may refer to:

 Resampling (audio), several related audio processes
 Resampling (statistics), resampling methods in statistics
 Resampling (bitmap), scaling of bitmap images

See also
 Sample-rate conversion
 Downsampling
 Upsampling
 Oversampling
 Sampling (information theory)
 Signal (information theory)
 Data conversion
 Interpolation
 Multivariate interpolation
 Subsampling (disambiguation)